Morten Eilifsen (born January 6, 1984) is a Norwegian cross-country skier who competed between 2004 and 2014. His best World Cup finish was ninth in a 15 km event in Norway in 2007. Eilifsen's lone win was in the 4 × 10 km relay in Sweden in 2008. He was never selected to compete in the Olympic Games or the FIS Nordic World Ski Championships.

Cross-country skiing results
All results are sourced from the International Ski Federation (FIS).

World Cup

Season standings

Team podiums

 1 victory – (1 )
 3 podiums – (3 )

References

External links

1984 births
Living people
Norwegian male cross-country skiers